Palafoxia integrifolia, commonly known as the coastalplain palafox and coastal plain palafox, is a species of palafox native to the southeastern United States.

Description

Palafoxia integrifolia is a herbaceous annual plant with pinkish-white disc flowers arranged in inflorescences. It has glossy, alternating leaves which elongate on the lower portion of the stems and more linear at the top.
The stems of P. integrifolia are less woody than other species of palafox, making it prone to drooping.

Taxonomy and etymology
Palafoxia integrifolia was described in 1842 by Thomas Nuttall. The generic name refers to José de Palafox y Melci, while the species name is derived from the Latin word integrifolius, meaning "having entire leaves". Polypteris integrifolia is a valid synonym.

Distribution and habitat
Palafoxia integrifolia is found in the states of Georgia and Florida, where it grows in sandy uplands.

Ecology
Like other Palafoxia species, P. integrifolia is attractive to birds and insects, which aid in pollination.

References

External links
 USDA plant profile
 Flora of North America

integrifolia
Endemic flora of the United States
Flora of Florida
Flora of Georgia (U.S. state)
Taxa named by Asa Gray
Taxa named by John Torrey
Flora without expected TNC conservation status